Coro or CORO may refer to:

Entertainment
 Coro (Berio), a composition by Luciano Berio 
 Coro (music), Italian for choir
 Coro TV, Venezuelan community television channel
 Omweso (Coro), mancala game played in the Lango region of Uganda
 Coro, The Sixteen's record label

People
 Coro (footballer), Spanish footballer
 Coro (singer), Dominican singer and actor

Places
 Coro Coro Municipality
 Coro Gulf
 Coro Province, historic province of Gran Colombia
 Coro region, a geographical region of Venezuela
 Coro, Venezuela, the capital city of Falcón State

Other
 Coro (non-profit organization), teaches leadership skills to young adults
 Corocraft, costume jewelry makers of the early 20th century